Rubber room may refer to:
 Padded cells
 Reassignment center, also known as a rubber room in the New York City school system
 The Rubber Room, a 2010 documentary film about the New York City school system and reassignment centers
 "Rubber Room", the final episode of the US television drama Law & Order
 Rubber room (bunker), emergency egress bunkers located below the launch pads at Kennedy Space Center